Lefkadia F.C. is a Greek football club, based in Lefkadia, Imathia.

The club was founded in 1966. They will play for 2nd season in Football League 2 for the season 2014-15.

Football clubs in Central Macedonia